Joseph Robert Redmond (born September 28, 1977) is a former American football running back in the National Football League (NFL).  He played for the New England Patriots and Oakland Raiders, and won Super Bowl XXXVI as a member of the Patriots over the St. Louis Rams.

College career
As a senior at Arizona State University he was a Heisman Trophy and Doak Walker award candidate, and was one of the premier kick returners in the country. He ranks third in ASU history with 3,299 career rushing yards. His total career yardage ranks 26th in Pac-10 history.

1997: 142 carries for 805 yards with 7 TD.  15 catches for 186 yards with 1 TD.
1998: 166 carries for 833 yards with 11 TD.  22 catches for 194 yards.
1999: 241 carries for 1174 yards with 12 TD.  15 catches for 100 yards with 1 TD.

Professional career
Redmond was drafted in the third round of the 2000 NFL Draft. Redmond is best known for his role on the 2001 New England Patriots. Redmond caught three passes in the Patriots' game-winning overtime drive during the famous "Snow Bowl" playoff game against the Oakland Raiders. Most famously, in Super Bowl XXXVI, with the Patriots on their own 30-yard line with 41 seconds left, Redmond caught a 3-yard dump-down pass from quarterback Tom Brady, dodged a tackler to pass the first down marker and then dragged a second tackler to the sideline, extending the ball out of bounds to stop the clock.  The stopped clock allowed the Patriots to keep the drive alive and led, plays later, to a Patriots victory on an Adam Vinatieri field goal.  Charlie Weis, the Patriots offensive coordinator at the time, has said that he would have recommended playing for overtime had Redmond not gotten the first down or failed to get out of bounds and stopped the clock.

References

1977 births
Living people
Sportspeople from Los Angeles County, California
American football running backs
Arizona State Sun Devils football players
New England Patriots players
Oakland Raiders players
Arizona Cardinals players
People from Carson, California
Players of American football from California